Claude Black (October 24, 1932 – January 17, 2013) was an American jazz pianist who performed with Stan Getz, Charlie Parker, Wes Montgomery, Sonny Stitt, Aretha Franklin and, for the last few decades of his life, with bassist Clifford Murphy.

Background 
Black was born in Detroit. He began his jazz career in 1948, but his big success came in 1965, when he began a tour with Aretha Franklin. Black died on January 17, 2013, at the age of 80, after suffering from cancer for a long time.

References

1930 births
2013 deaths
American jazz pianists
American male pianists
Musicians from Detroit
Deaths from cancer in Ohio
Musicians from Toledo, Ohio
20th-century American pianists
Jazz musicians from Michigan
Jazz musicians from Ohio
20th-century American male musicians
American male jazz musicians